Santiago Rodríguez Taverna (born 16 July 1999) is an Argentine professional tennis player.

Rodríguez Taverna has a career high ATP singles ranking of 179 achieved on 20 June 2022. He also has a career high doubles ranking of 230 achieved on 20 June 2022.

Rodríguez Taverna has won 1 ATP Challenger singles title at the 2022 Challenger de Tigre.

Career
Ranked No. 201 at the 2022 French Open he qualified to make his Grand Slam main draw debut defeating Dimitar Kuzmanov. In the first round, he took World No. 14 Taylor Fritz to five sets in a match that lasted more than three and a half hours.

Challenger and Itf Futures/World Tennis Tour finals

Singles (7–8)

References

External links
 
 

1999 births
Living people
Tennis players from Buenos Aires
Argentine male tennis players
21st-century Argentine people